Stefan Hodgetts (born 17 June 1982 in Bromsgrove) is a British auto racing driver, best known for driving a part season in the British Touring Car Championship. His father Chris was twice champion of the BTCC.

Racing career

After starting in karting, he switched to single-seater racing in 1998, in Formula 600. In 1999 he finished fifth in the Formula Vauxhall Championship and fourth in Formula Ford Winter Series. He had drives in both the Formula Ford Championship and the Formula Renault Championship in 2000, and Formula Ford Championship and Formula Renault Euro Cup in 2001. In 2003 he raced in the inaugural SEAT Cupra Championship, finishing the season third in points. In 2004 he got a drive in the BTCC for the Gary Ayles ran Team Sureterm. He did not start the season till round thirteen at Mondello Park in a Vauxhall Astra Coupe. After missing the meeting at Knockhill he rejoined for the rest of the season at Brands Hatch for the same team, but in an Alfa Romeo 156. He finished fifteenth in the independents championship, and total standings in eighteenth with four points.

He drove in the Renault Clio Cup in 2007 for MOMO UK, and for Total Control Racing in 2008. He made a one-off appearance in the guest car in the Ginetta G50 Cup at Croft in 2010, finishing on the podium in all three races.

Racing record

Complete British Touring Car Championship results
(key) (Races in bold indicate pole position – 1 point awarded just in first race) (Races in italics indicate fastest lap – 1 point awarded all races) (* signifies that driver lead race for at least one lap – 1 point awarded all races)

Complete British GT Championship results
(key) (Races in bold indicate pole position in class; races in italics indicate fastest lap in class)

* Season still in progress.
† Driver did not finish the race, but was classified as he completed over 90% of the race distance.
‡ As Hodgetts was a guest driver, he was ineligible for championship points.

External links
 BTCC Pages Profile.

Living people
1982 births
English racing drivers
Formula Renault Eurocup drivers
British Touring Car Championship drivers
Formula Ford drivers
Sportspeople from Bromsgrove
British GT Championship drivers
Porsche Carrera Cup GB drivers
Britcar 24-hour drivers
Ginetta GT4 Supercup drivers
Renault UK Clio Cup drivers
Motaworld Racing drivers
British Formula Three Championship drivers
JHR Developments drivers